Mladost 1 Metro Station is a station on the Sofia Metro in Bulgaria. It opened on May 8, 2009. The station is served by M1 and M4 lines. M1 line continues towards Business Park, while M4 continues to Sofia Airport.

Public Transportation
 Trolleybus service: 5
 City Bus service: 111, 113, 306, 314
 Suburban Bus service: 4

Location
The station is located between the intersection of Andrei Sakharov Blvd. with Jerusalem St. in the residential area Mladost 1 and the market on both sides of the boulevard in the direction of Alexander Malinov. The metrostation is underground, with side platforms, shallow setting. The station is done in blue tones with pale yellow walls and floor, above the platforms are transverse vaulted segments of a suspended ceiling type "Hunter Douglas", which reflect light. The station has two underground vestibules, which are connected to the subways at the crossroads.

After this station, the track branches off in the direction of the airport (Line M4) and in the direction of zh.k. Mladost 4, near the Business Park (Line M1).

Gallery

References

External links

 360 degrees panorama from inside the station
 Sofia Metropolitan
 Unofficial site

Sofia Metro stations
Railway stations opened in 2009
2009 establishments in Bulgaria